Saltman is an English surname. Notable people with the surname include:

Benjamin Saltman (1927–1999), American poet and academic
David Saltman (born 1946), American writer
Elliot Saltman (born 1982), Scottish golfer
Lloyd Saltman (born 1985), Scottish golfer
Paul Saltman (1928–1999), American biologist
Shelly Saltman (born 1931), American sports promoter

See also
Zaltzman (surname)
Saltsman

English-language surnames